Savage Grace is an American power and speed metal band formed in Los Angeles in 1981 by Chris Logue and Brian East (nicknamed "The Beast", from the Pacific Northwest band AlleyBrat), initially active between 1981 and 1993. They reformed in 2009, and subsequently released an EP entitled The Lost Grace. In 2010, they performed at the Up the Hammers, Bang Your Head!!! and Keep It True festivals.

Biography
Their original name was Marquis de Sade, named after the French aristocrat of the same name. They would later change their name to Savage Grace after the 1970s rock band led by Ron Koss that were on Warner/Reprise Records.  Their first demos were recorded with Ozzy Osbourne's guitarist Randy Rhoads' brother Kelle on vocals. Randy had suggested the name Savage Grace to Kelle.

Metal Blade would select the song "Scepters of Deceit" from a three song demo for their 1982 Metal Massacre II compilation, with Dwight Cliff taking over vocals from Rhoads.

The band's 1983 debut release, The Dominatress EP, was recorded with Logue on guitar, Brian "Beast" East on bass, Dan Finch on drums, John Birk on vocals and new guitarist Kenny Powell on guitar (who would soon leave to form his own band, Omen).

The band's first full-length album, Master of Disguise, followed in 1985 and introduced yet another new vocalist, Mike Smith.  The album's controversial cover depicts a police officer with red demon-like eyes keeping a topless girl cleave gagged and handcuffed to his motorcycle. The album was also recorded with only one guitar player, Chris Logue handled all guitar duties. During its release Grace were joined for a short period by Kurt Phillips of Canadian band Witchkiller and then Mark "Chase" Marshall. Later Mike Smith was fired and, after touring Europe, Dan Finch left the band.

The sophomore album, 1986's After the fall from Grace, was recorded by Chris Logue on guitars and lead vocals, Brian East on bass, Mark "Chase" Marshall on guitar and Mark Marcum on drums. After another tour of Europe, Beast left the band.

The group's final output, the Ride Into The Night EP, included a cover of the Deep Purple classic "Burn". It also featured new bass player Derek Peace, a member of Heir Apparent.

The band was also featured on the Speed Metal Hell - Vol. 1 compilation album in 1985, with the songs "Master of Disguise" and "Fear my Way".  Another song, "Mainline Lover", appeared on the 1993 compilation American Metal - Heavy 'N' Dirty.

In 2010, Chris Logue reformed the band with musicians of the German band Roxxcalibur, and played a European tour in April and May in addition to festivals such as Keep It True and Bang Your Head!!!. The band split up in October 2010. The whole Savage Grace back catalog was re-released by the German label Limb Music and several live songs were set to be included on the Keep It True Festival 2010 DVD. A new album was planned after the tour, but Logue mysteriously disappeared during the songwriting sessions. The new line-up decided to bring in a new vocalist and released the already finished songs in late 2013 under the moniker of Masters Of Disguise.

On February 8, 2023, it was announced the band would be released their third album, Sign of the Cross, on May 5. It is the band's first album in 37 years.

Line-up

Current members
 Christian Logue – vocals (1981–1992, 2020–present), guitars (1985–1992, 2009–2010)
 Kiko Shred – guitars (2020–present)
 Gabriel Colón – vocals (2022–present)
 David Sandoval – guitars (2022–present)

Former members
 Brian "Beast" East – bass (1981–1986)
 Kelly Rhoads – vocals (1981)
 Steve Wittig – drums (1981)
 Dan Finch III – drums (1981–1985)
 Dwight Cliff – vocals (1981–1983)
 John Birk – vocals (1983–1984)
 Kenny Powell – guitars (1983–1984)
 Kurt Phillips – guitars (1984)
 Mark "Chase" Marshall – guitars (1984–1989)
 Mike Smith – vocals (1984–1985)
 Mark Marcum – drums (1986–1988)
 Derek Peace – bass (1986–1987)
 Neal Delaforce – bass (1987–1988)
 Mike Breanning – bass (1989–1992)
 Marshall Lee Dickerson – drums (1989–1992)
 Keith Alexander – guitars (1991)
 Gene Chapman – guitars (1992)

Live members
 Mario Lang – bass (2009–2010)
 Andreas Neuderth – drums (2009–2010)
 Roger Dequis – guitars (2009–2010)
 Eric "Kalli" Kaldschmidt – guitars (2009–2010)

Discography

Albums
 Master of Disguise (1985)
 After the Fall from Grace (1986)
 Sign of the Cross (2023)

Demos/EPs
 1982 Demo (1982)
 Demo (1982)
 The Dominatress (EP) (1983)
 1984 Demo (1984)
 Ride Into the Night (EP) (1987)

Compilations
 Metal Massacre II (1982)
 Speed Metal Hell - Vol. 1 (1985)
 American Metal - Heavy 'n' Dirty (1993)

References

External links
 Metal Forces Magazine profile

American speed metal musical groups
Heavy metal musical groups from California
Musical groups established in 1981
Musical groups disestablished in 1993
Metal Blade Records artists